Stichtsche Cricket en Hockey Club, commonly known as SCHC, is a Dutch sports club based in Bilthoven, Utrecht. The club was founded on 22 November 1906. The club is best known for its field hockey department but it also has a rugby union and a cricket section.

The first men's hockey team played in de the second division until the 2020–21 season called the Promotieklasse after being relegated in the 2018–19 season. While the women's team has played on the highest level since 2004.

Honours

Men
National title: 1
 1958–59
Dutch national title indoor hockey: 2
 2000, 2019

Women
EuroHockey Club Cup: 1
 2015

Players

Current squad

Women's squad

Notable players

Men's internationals

 Lucas Cammareri
 Matias Cammareri
 Pedro Ibarra

 Conor Empey

 Michael Darling
 Conor Harte 
 David Harte 
 Michael Watt

 Albert Sala

Women's internationals

 Soledad Garcia 
 Mariana González Oliva
 Delfina Merino 
/
 Beth Storry 
 Maddie Hinch
 Anna Toman
 
 Inge Vermeulen

References

External links
 Official website of SCHC

 
Dutch field hockey clubs
Field hockey clubs established in 1906
Sports clubs in De Bilt
1906 establishments in the Netherlands
Multi-sport clubs in the Netherlands